Ginsbach may refer to:

Ginsbach (Jagst), a river of Baden-Württemberg, Germany, tributary of the Jagst near Krautheim
Oberginsbach, a former municipality of Baden-Württemberg, Germany, now part of Krautheim
Unterginsbach, a former municipality of Baden-Württemberg, Germany, now part of Krautheim